Hunan is a town under the administration of Qujiang District, Quzhou, Zhejiang, China. , it has 9 villages under its administration.

References 

Towns of Zhejiang
Quzhou